Cypraeovula alfredensis is a species of sea snail, a cowry, a marine gastropod mollusk in the family Cypraeidae, the cowries.

Subspecies
Cypraeovula alfredensis alfredensis (Schilder & Schilder, 1929)
Cypraeovula alfredensis transkeiana Lorenz, 2002

References

 Steyn, D.G. & Lussi, M. (1998) Marine Shells of South Africa. An Illustrated Collector’s Guide to Beached Shells. Ekogilde Publishers, Hartebeespoort, South Africa, ii + 264 pp. page(s): 60

Cypraeidae